Serdar Özbayraktar (born November 22, 1981 in Hopa, Turkey), is a Turkish retired footballer player who played as a striker or winger.

Career

Elazığspor
On the last day of the January transfermarket 2019, Özbayraktar was one of 22 players on two hours, that signed for Turkish club Elazığspor. had been placed under a transfer embargo but managed to negotiate it with the Turkish FA, leading to them going on a mad spree of signing and registering a load of players despite not even having a permanent manager in place. In just two hours, they managed to snap up a record 22 players - 12 coming in on permanent contracts and a further 10 joining on loan deals until the end of the season.

References

External links
  
Elazığspor'da 9 oyuncu ayrıldı - PTT 1. Lig, sporx.com, 6 January 2016
 
 

1981 births
Living people
Turkish footballers
Gençlerbirliği S.K. footballers
Şanlıurfaspor footballers
Mardinspor footballers
Gaziantepspor footballers
Eskişehirspor footballers
Elazığspor footballers
Göztepe S.K. footballers
Ümraniyespor footballers
Fatih Karagümrük S.K. footballers
Süper Lig players
People from Artvin
Association football forwards